Jasmine D'Souza is an Indian Model, Bollywood actress and a film director. She is the winner of the Gladrags Mrs. India 2001 beauty pageant. She is known for her role in 88 Antop Hill.

Career
Jasmine D'Souza started her career as a model endorsing popular brands such as Lakme, Mitsubishi Lancer, Nescafe, Cinthol Soap, Lux Soap, Colgate, Sunsilk, Maggi Soups, World Gold Council, De Beers Diamonds, Shoppers Stop, and others. Jasmine was a television show host for the Food Food channel. She is the director of Hindi movie One Night Stand (2016 film) which was released worldwide release on 6 May 2016.

Personal life
Jasmine D’Souza married a film director in 1998.

Filmography
As director
One Night Stand (2016)

References

Female models from Mumbai
Living people
Indian women film directors
Place of birth missing (living people)
Year of birth missing (living people)
Film directors from Mumbai
Indian actresses

External links